is a district located in western Kanagawa Prefecture, Japan. Most of the mountainous district is sparsely populated, and is part of the Tanzawa-Ōyama Quasi-National Park. Parts of the cities of Hadano and Odawara, and the entire city of Minamiashigara were formerly part of Ashigarakami District.

As of 2009, the district had an estimated population of 67,954 and a density of 224 persons per km2. The total area was 303.44 km2.

Towns and villages 
Nakai
Ōi
Matsuda
Yamakita
Kaisei

History

The area was under control of the later Hōjō clan in the Sengoku period, and part of Odawara Domain during the Edo period. Following disasters caused by eruptions of nearby Mount Fuji, a portion also came to be held as tenryō territory administered by the Tokugawa shogunate.

Timeline
After the Meiji Restoration, it initially formed part of the short-lived Ashigara Prefecture, before was established as a district of Kanagawa Prefecture under the cadastral reform of 1878. In 1889, it was administratively divided into 26 villages.

On April 1, 1972, part of Ashigarakami District became the city of Minamiashigara.

Merger table

Districts in Kanagawa Prefecture